Deep Space Optical Communications (DSOC) is a laser space communication system in development meant to improve communications performance 10 to 100 times over the current radio frequency technology without incurring increases in mass, volume or power. DSOC will be capable of providing high bandwidth downlinks from beyond cislunar space.

The project is led by NASA's Jet Propulsion Laboratory (JPL) in Pasadena, California.

Overview

Future human expeditions may require a steady stream of high-definition imagery, live video feeds, and real-time data transmission across deep space to enable timely guidance and updates during the long-distance journeys. Even at its maximum data rate of 5.2 megabits per second (Mbps), the Mars Reconnaissance Orbiter (MRO) requires 7.5 hours to transmit all of its onboard recorder, and 1.5 hours to send a single HiRISE image to be processed back on Earth. New high-resolution hyperspectral imagers put further demands on their communications system, requiring even higher data rates.

The precursor technology demonstration for this optical transceiver is scheduled to launch in 2022 on board NASA's robotic Psyche mission to study the giant metal asteroid known as 16 Psyche. The laser beams from the spacecraft will be received by a ground telescope at Palomar Observatory in California. Laser beams to the spacecraft will be sent from a smaller telescope at the Table Mountain Observatory in California.

Design 

This new technology will employ advanced lasers in the near-infrared region (1.55 µm) of the electromagnetic spectrum. The architecture is based on transmitting a laser beacon from Earth to assist line-of-sight stabilization and pointing back of the downlink laser beam. In addition,  efficient codes are used for error free communications. The system must correct for background noise (scattered light) from Earth's atmosphere and the Sun. The performance of the uplink is expected to be 292 kbit/s at a distance of 0.4 AU. The transmitted beam-width is inversely proportional to the frequency used, so the shorter the wavelength used, the narrower and more focused a beam can be made. The downlink bandwidth will depend on the ground telescope diameter and will be less during daytime.

Three key DSOC technologies developed for the project include:
a low-mass spacecraft disturbance isolation and pointing assembly for operating in the presence of spacecraft vibrational disturbance.
a high-efficiency flight laser transmitter; 
a pair of high-efficiency photon counting detector arrays for the flight optical transceiver and the ground-based receiver (a telescope).

Psyche mission 

A Deep Space Optical Communication demonstration will be included with NASA's Psyche mission, scheduled for launch in mid-2023. The Psyche spacecraft will explore the metal asteroid 16 Psyche, reaching at the asteroid belt in 2029.

See also

References

Laser communication in space